Mircea Petescu (15 May 1942 – 16 December 2018) was a Romanian professional footballer and coach.

Playing career

Club career
Mircea Petescu was born on 15 May 1942 in Pecica. He made his Divizia A debut on 6 September 1959 playing for UTA Arad in a 2–2 against Steagul Roșu Brașov. After only one season spent at UTA, he went to play for rival Știința Timișoara for three seasons, a club which loaned him at Viitorul București for a half-season. In 1963, Petescu went to play for Steaua București for four seasons, where he helped the team win two Cupa României. In 1967, he returned at UTA, where he would play for six seasons, helping the team under the guidance of coach Nicolae Dumitrescu win two consecutive Divizia A titles, contributing at the first with 8 goals scored in 27 appearances and in the second with 30 games played with one goal scored. He also made some European performances with The Old Lady as leading the team as captain when they managed to eliminate the defending European Cup champions Feyenoord in the 1970–71 European Cup season and playing 8 games in the 1971–72 UEFA Cup campaign when the team reached the quarter-finals where they were eliminated by Tottenham Hotspur who would eventually win the competition. Petescu ended his playing career at FC Dordrecht in Netherlands, he has a total of 326 Divizia A appearances in which he scored 24 goals and 22 appearances in European competitions.

International career
Mircea Petescu played two games for Romania, making on 27 October 1968 under coach Angelo Niculescu in a 3–0 loss against Portugal at the 1970 World Cup qualifiers. His second game was a friendly which ended 0–0 against England. He also played three games for Romania's Olympic team at the 1964 Summer Olympics, helping the team finish in the 5th place.

Managerial career
After years of preparation, Petescu and his wife defected while on a state-approved vacation to the Netherlands. There he started a coaching career and became known for promoting youngsters in the teams he coached. He coached Louis van Gaal at Telstar and Sparta and discovered Danny Blind amongst many other players.

Sports agent career
After he ended his career as a football player and manager, Petescu became a sports agent. After the 1989 Romanian Revolution, Petescu made the first important transfer for the Romanian football, Gheorghe Hagi's move from Steaua București to Real Madrid for 4 million $. He also worked at the transfers of Gheorghe Popescu to PSV Eindhoven, Ioan Sabău to Feyenoord and Dorinel Munteanu to Cercle Brugge.

Honours

Club
UTA Arad
Divizia A: 1968–69, 1969–70
Steaua București
Cupa României: 1965–66, 1966–67

International
Romania U18
Under-18 European Championship: 1962

Notes

References

External links
Mircea Petescu at olympic.org

1942 births
2018 deaths
People from Pecica
Romanian defectors
Romanian emigrants to the Netherlands
Association football defenders
Romanian footballers
Romania international footballers
Footballers at the 1964 Summer Olympics
Olympic footballers of Romania
FC UTA Arad players
FC Politehnica Timișoara players
FC Steaua București players
Liga I players
FC Dordrecht players
Romanian expatriate footballers
Expatriate footballers in the Netherlands
Romanian expatriate sportspeople in the Netherlands
Romanian football managers
SC Telstar managers
Sparta Rotterdam managers
FC Dordrecht managers
Go Ahead Eagles managers
Eredivisie managers
Romanian expatriate football managers
Expatriate football managers in the Netherlands
Association football agents